Dmitri Veniaminovich Radyukin (born May 16, 1969) is a Russian professional football coach. Currently, he manages FC Gornyak Uchaly.

Radyukin managed Russian National Football League side FC Sibir Novosibirsk for 30 matches, winning 13, from May 2011 to December 2011.

References

External links
  Career summary at KLISF

1969 births
Living people
Russian football managers
FC Sibir Novosibirsk managers
FC Gornyak Uchaly managers